Paul Arnold may refer to:
 Paul Arnold (American football) (born 1980), American football player
 Paul Arnold (Michigan politician) (1893–1973), former member of the Michigan House of Representatives
 Paul Arnold (baseball) (1903–1979), American Negro leagues baseball player
 Paul Arnold (rugby union) (born 1968), Welsh rugby player
 Paul Arnold (composer) (born 1972), English video game and film music composer
 Paul Arnold (judge) (r. 1975–1983), French judge, the initiator and the first President of European Buddhist Union